The Green Dragon was a wooden roller coaster located at Lake Compounce in Bristol, Connecticut. It opened in 1914 but was later replaced by the Wildcat. It was the first electrically powered roller coaster at the nation's oldest continuously operating amusement park.

This roller coaster was demolished in 1927 to make way for the Wildcat.